Shao Wenkai (1887–????) was a member of the military in the Republic of China. He belonged to the Fengtian clique, later he became important  during the Wang Jingwei regime. His courtesy name was Zhongze. He was born in Liaoyang, Liaoning.

Biography 
In 1919 Shao Wenkai graduated from the Three Northeast Military Academy's Department of Infantry in the 5th period. In 1927 he was appointed Chief of Staff of the 8th Army of the Northeast Army. In the next year he was promoted to acting Commander of the 27th Brigade of the North East Army. In 1931 he was appointed Vice-Provost Marshal of Northeast and Chief Martial Law Administrator in Beiping (Peking). In 1936 he became corresponding lieutenant general.

Later Shao Wenkai participated in the Wang Jingwei regime. In May 1944 he was appointed Governor of Henan. He served in that post until the following May, when he was appointed a member of the Military Commission.

After the Wang Jingwei regime collapsed, Shao Wenkai was arrested by Chiang Kai-shek's National Government. He was convicted of treason and surrender to the enemy (namely Hanjian) and sentenced to death by a military tribunal, but his fate remains unknown.

References

Footnotes 
 
 
 

Republic of China warlords from Liaoning
National Revolutionary Army generals from Liaoning
Military personnel of the Republic of China in the Second Sino-Japanese War
Chinese collaborators with Imperial Japan
1887 births
Year of death uncertain
Politicians from Liaoyang